Vice Admiral Newton Alexander McCully (1867–1951) was an officer in the United States Navy who served in the Spanish–American War and World War I.

Biography
McCully, the son of Newton A. and Caroline Fretwell McCully, was born on 19 June 1867 in Anderson, South Carolina and attended the United States Naval Academy (Class of 1887).

As a lieutenant commander, McCully served as a military observer embedded within the Imperial Russian Army during the Russo-Japanese War in 1904, arriving at the front lines in Manchuria via the Trans-Siberian Railway. He returned to the United States in 1906, and submitted a long report on his findings. After the end of the war, McCully served as executive officer on the cruiser . He was assigned to the staff of the Naval War College in 1910. In 1914, McCully returned to Russia as a naval attaché. In 1918, as a rear admiral, he was placed in command of United States Navy forces in northern Russia.

In December 1919 McCully was sent to south Russia on an intelligence mission, along with his aide, Lieutenant Commander Hugo W. Koehler, to join the Whites and report on the strength of the Bolsheviks and their potential threat.

In 1920, McCully adopted seven Russian children.

McCully served in various assignments in the 1920s, and served as the Commander of the Scouting Fleet until 1924 when he became the chief of the American naval mission in Brazil. By 1928 McCully was the Commandant of the Charleston Navy Yard. He went into retirement in 1931.

Late in life, at age 59, McCully married Olga Krundycher (Russian), age 29, on 24 October 1927.

Admiral McCully died on 14 June 1951 in St. Augustine, Florida.

Awards
 Navy Distinguished Service Medal
 Sampson Medal
 Navy Expeditionary Medal
 Spanish Campaign Medal
 Mexican Service Medal
 World War I Victory Medal

Distinguished Service Medal Citation
The President of the United States of America takes pleasure in presenting the Navy Distinguished Service Medal to Rear Admiral Newton Alexander McCully, United States Navy, for exceptionally meritorious service in a duty of great responsibility as District Commander, Rochefort, in successfully handling naval activities in France south of the Loire River and safeguarding American convoys through the submarine zone during World War I.

References

Further reading
 McCully, Newton A., The McCully report: the Russo-Japanese War, 1904–05, Annapolis, Maryland. Naval Institute Press, 1977.
 
 Weeks, Charles J., An American Naval Diplomat in Revolutionary Russia: The Life and Times of Vice Admiral Newton A. McCully, 1867–1951. Annapolis, Maryland. Naval Institute Press 1993.

1867 births
1951 deaths
Military personnel from South Carolina
People from Anderson, South Carolina
United States Naval Academy alumni
United States Navy admirals
People of the Russo-Japanese War
American military personnel of the Spanish–American War
United States Navy personnel of World War I
Recipients of the Navy Distinguished Service Medal
American military personnel of the Russian Civil War